Wamsutta ( 16341662), also known as Alexander Pokanoket, as he was called by New England colonists, was the eldest son of Massasoit (meaning Great Leader) Ousa Mequin of the Pokanoket Tribe and Wampanoag nation, and brother of Metacomet.

Life 

Wamsutta was born circa 1634 as the eldest son of Massasoit Ousa Mequin, leader of the Pokanoket. Wamsutta married Weetamoo.

After Massasoit's death, Wamsutta assumed leadership of the Pokanoket, becoming leader of all the Native American tribes between the Charles River in Massachusetts and Narraganset Bay in Rhode Island, including the tribes in eastern Rhode Island and eastern Massachusetts. Wamsutta, whom the English named Alexander, agreed to adhere to the peace established by his father. As a result of a collapse of the fur trade, he substantially increased the power of the Pokanoket by selling land to colonists. However, rumors soon began to circulate that he was conspiring with the Narragansetts to attack the English. In 1662, the English accused Wamsutta of independently negotiating land sales.  In 1662, he was summoned to and seized by the Plymouth Court. After being questioned, Wamsutta became ill and soon died.

The cause of death was disputed, and Wamsutta's brother Metacomet (who succeeded Wamsutta in leadership of the Pokanoket) suspected that he had been poisoned. Wamsutta's death was one of the factors that would eventually lead to the 1675 King Philip's War. Some historians believe Wamsutta was poisoned or tortured by Governor Josiah Winslow, who saw him as a threat; however, considering Winslow's father, Edward Winslow, and Governor William Bradford (both of whom had died before this), and their previous peaceful relations with Wamsutta's father, Massasoit, such speculation is open to question. This issue is examined in the 2017 historical novel "My Father's Kingdom" by James W. George.

Metacomet (or Metacom), known as King Philip to the colonists and officials at Plymouth, signed an agreement with the English in 1662. Like Wamsutta and his father before him, Philip vowed not to needlessly or unjustly provoke or raise war with any other natives. In return, the colonists agreed to advise and aid Philip. However, it was an uneasy alliance and hostilities between natives and colonists continued to grow.

Legacy 
Wamsutta has been the namesake of businesses and places:  
In 1846, the Wamsutta Company's textile mill opened in New Bedford.
In 1861, 20-year-old Henry H. Rogers and his partner Charles Ellis of Massachusetts named their tiny venture near Oil City, Pennsylvania, the Wamsutta Oil Refinery. Rogers later became a principal in John D. Rockefeller's Standard Oil empire.
USS Wamsutta was the name of a United States Navy steamer in commission from 1863 to 1865.
In 1866, the Wamsutta Club was founded in New Bedford. It was a club for the affluent residents, who had generally made their money from the flagging whaling industry, as well as the up-and-coming textiles, for which the club was named.
1945-1975, Camp Wamsutta, a summer camp, operated in Charlton, Massachusetts.
Post-1975, Wamsutta Estates is a residential development in Charlton, Massachusetts.
In 1997, the Wamsutta Middle School was built in Attleboro, Massachusetts.
In modern times, Wamsutta is a brand name of textile products marketed by Springs Global.

See also 
 List of early settlers of Rhode Island

References
https://vc.bridgew.edu/bmas/64/
 (See ship namesake section)
Heath, Dwight B.
“A Journal of the Pilgrims at Plymouth: Mourt’s Relation”, A relation or journal of the English Plantation settled at Plymouth in New England, by certain English adventurers both merchants and others. Edited from the original printing of 1622. p. 7.

1630s births
1662 deaths
Native American leaders
Native Americans connected with Plymouth Colony
People of colonial Massachusetts
Wampanoag people
Native American history of Massachusetts
Native American people from Massachusetts